Pakistanis in Bahrain comprise Pakistani people living as expatriates or immigrants in Bahrain and their locally born descendants. The Overseas Pakistanis Foundation estimates that the population of Pakistanis in Bahrain stands at 110,000 as of 31 December 2014. The Pakistani community maintains two schools, the Pakistan School, Bahrain (managed by parents elected board, Patron in chief- Ambassador of Islamic Republic of Pakistan) and Pakistan Urdu School which educates community youth.

For the welfare of the Pakistani community in Bahrain, the Pakistan Club has been established in Manama, which holds numerous events such as Iftar Nights and National Day celebrations.

Profession and integration

The British Army in the past sent its most reliable force from Punjab and India to Bahrain. The presence of Pakistanis in Bahrain dates back to 1950. Bahrain is the first Arab country to grant citizenship to people who had served its country. A Pakistani can be granted citizenship after working for the government for 25 years. Up to 30,000 Pakistanis are thought to have obtained Bahraini citizenship.

Service in Bahrain
Majority of Pakistanis work in public protection and the army to help provide security for Bahrain. The young educated people tend to put there effort in helping Bahrain's economy, which has been hit severely by the ongoing protests. The protests have seen many Pakistanis injured by mobs.

The Pakistan army affiliated Fauji Foundation and Pakistan navy affiliated Bahria Foundation have also been recruiting Pakistani military personnel as for the Bahrain National Guard (a paramilitary body). Following the 2011 Bahraini protests, advertisements for additional 800-1,000 recruits had been advertised in Pakistani newspapers. This is in addition to at least (conservative estimate) 2,000 Pakistanis already serving in Bahrain security forces (military and police force).  According to an estimate by the Wall Street Journal, Pakistanis contribute at least up to 7,000 of the 25,000 strong Bahrain police force. In total, almost 10,000 Pakistanis contribute to various Bahrain security forces. The Pakistan army and Bahrain National Guard are also known to maintain strong ties.

Military presence
Pakistan maintains a two battalion strong military base in Bahrain, comprising some 1300 men and an armour squadron.

Education
1. Pakistan Urdu School educates Pakistanis in Bahrain.
http://www.pakurduschool.com/
2. Pakistan school Bahrain (https://pakistanschool.org/)

Notable people
 Salah Abdul Rasool Al Blooshi – former Guantanamo prisoner 
 Adil Hanif – athlete
 Mohammed Khalid – former MP

See also

Bahrain–Pakistan relations
Embassy of Pakistan, Manama

External links
Pakistanis mark National Day in Bahrain
Anthropometric Characteristics of Pakistani School Children Living in Bahrain
Squatters occupying overseas Pakistanis’ homes in Bahrain: ambassador
 Bahrain Immigration

References

 
Ethnic groups in Bahrain